Ailia coila, also known as the Gangetic ailia is a species of catfish in the family Ailiidae native to India, Bangladesh, Nepal and Pakistan.  This species grows to a length of  TL.  

Locally this fish is known as "kajoli in West Bengal. In Bangladesh, people call it banspata (bamboo leaf). Its flesh is regarded as highly palatable. 

This fish is of importance to local commercial fisheries.

The habitat of A. coila is sharply decreasing due to natural and anthropogenic causes.

A. coila is most closely related to Eutropiichthys vacha with 85.63% genetic sequence identity.

References

Fish of Asia
Fish of Bangladesh
Fish of India
Fish of Nepal
Fish of Pakistan
Fish described in 1822
Taxa named by Francis Buchanan-Hamilton